The Land of Elyon is a series of children's fantasy novels by Patrick Carman.

The series consists of:

Book 1: The Dark Hills Divide

Book 2: Beyond the Valley of Thorns

Book 3: The Tenth City

Prequel: Into the Mist

Book 4: Stargazer

Prequel: Into the Mist is a prequel that tells of the early lives of Thomas and Roland Warvold and their introduction to Sir Alistair Wakefield and the Wakefield House. The Five Stone Pillars are introduced at the end of the book.

Book 4, Stargazer, takes place on the Five Stone Pillars, where the lost children of Castalia live. Abbadon is still alive and in the form of a metallic electric sea monster who is trying to destroy the fourth pillar. Most of the book takes place over a few days that Alexa and Yipes spend on the pillars plotting an escape.

Throughout the series, various characters can speak with or understand animals.

External links
 The Official Land Of Elyon Website

 
Novel series